Mary Pierce defeated Conchita Martínez in the final, 6–2, 7–5 to win the women's singles tennis title at the 2000 French Open. It was her second and last major singles title. Pierce became the first Frenchwoman to win the title since Françoise Dürr in 1967 and is the most recent Frenchwoman to win the tournament.

Steffi Graf was the reigning champion, but she retired from professional tennis in August 1999.

This was also the French Open main-draw debut of future champion Anastasia Myskina; she lost to Cara Black in the first round.

Seeds

Qualifying

Draw

Key
 Q = Qualifier
 WC = Wild card
 LL = Lucky loser
 r = Retired

Finals

Earlier rounds

Section 1

Section 2

Section 3

Section 4

Section 5

Section 6

Section 7

Section 8

External links
2000 French Open – Women's draws and results at the International Tennis Federation

Women's Singles
French Open by year – Women's singles
French Open - Women's Singles
French Open - singles
French Open - singles